Wygnanka may refer to the following places:
Wygnanka, Biała Podlaska County in Lublin Voivodeship (east Poland)
Wygnanka, Lubartów County in Lublin Voivodeship (east Poland)
Wygnanka, Radzyń Podlaski County in Lublin Voivodeship (east Poland)
Wygnanka, Masovian Voivodeship (east-central Poland)